İskender Pasha Mosque is a historic mosque located in the Kanlıca neighborhood of the Beykoz district of Istanbul, Turkey.

Located across the Kanlıca Pier, the mosque was commissioned by (military judge) Kazasker Gazi İskender Pasha and designed by the imperial architect Mimar Sinan in 1559–60. The mosque has a hipped roof and has been extensively rebuilt. The tomb of İskender Pasha is situated inside the mosque's courtyard.

Gallery

See also
 List of Friday mosques designed by Mimar Sinan

References

Sources
 

Ottoman mosques in Istanbul
Mosques completed in 1560
Mimar Sinan buildings
Beykoz
Bosphorus
16th-century mosques